Ernest Kurnow (October 21, 1912 – April 7, 2014) was a professor at New York University.

Early life
Kurnow was born in 1912 in Brooklyn, New York and attended The City College of New York and New York University. He was featured in a 2009 The New York Times interview  on his experience growing up during the Great Depression.

Career
Kurnow was professor of undergraduate business statistics at the Leonard N. Stern School of Business where he was teaching since 1948. In his tenure at NYU, he served as director of the Doctoral Program and was the chairman of the Department of Statistics and Operations Research from 1962 to 1976. Apart from his teaching activities, Kurnow was consultant to government organizations, private corporations, and public utilities in the areas of finance, survey design, and forecasting. He died at the age of 101 on April 7, 2014.

Education
 Ph.D., New York University, 1951
 M.S., City College of New York, 1933
 B.S., City College of New York, 1932

Awards
 NYU Alumni Great Teacher Award in 1974
 Fellow of the American Statistical Association
 Elected to the International Statistical Institute

References 

 Homepage of Ernest Kurnow 
 The Constant Statistician

  Death Notice Joyce Kurnow NYTimes
 AAUP: Oldest Practicing Professor?
 New York Times: Professor Ernest Kurnow shares Great Depression experience

1912 births
2014 deaths
City College of New York alumni
New York University alumni
New York University Stern School of Business faculty
American centenarians
Men centenarians
Fellows of the American Statistical Association